The University of Malta Students' Futsal Team, known as the University Futsal Team for short, is a futsal team that competes in the Maltese Futsal League. The team previously bore the name of its parent club, Mdina Knights F.C. In 2018, the team won its first silverware in the Maltese Futsal Knockout Cup.

History

Season 2014–15
In 2014, after a multi-year hiatus, the futsal section of the Mdina Knights began to play again. The move was prompted by officials from Kunsill Studenti Universitarji and Malta University Sports Club officials, who suggested the football club recruit University of Malta students to play on the team. On September 15, 2014, the team played their first match against Mqabba, a match which ended in a three-to-three tie.  The team ultimately finished their first season mid-table, surpassing the team's own expectations. Their wins included a victory over Luqa, a ten-to-zero shutout of Birzebbuga, and an upset against the then league leader, Mellieha. The team was the last opponent of Lija Futsal, who won the division title. In their match against Birzebbuga, vice-captain Cleaven Portelli registered the fastest goal of the season, scoring 13 seconds after the match's start.

Season 2015–16
After a positive inaugural season, the team sought a number of corporate partners. The team added Gaetano Gesualdi and other new players to their roster. The team strengthened its structures together with a healthy financial position, including charity for academic research towards Motor neuron diseases as part of its social responsibility, but found it difficult to adapt to the format change in the Maltese Futsal League. Although the team started positively, it finished in the eleventh place out of 14 teams. The Students were defeated by Swieqi United Futsal, Hamrun Futsal, and Luxol St Andrews Futsal Club, and were narrowly defeated by Sirens, Mqabba, and Zebbug. The team recovered toward the end of the season and won against Marsascala, Gozo, and Qrendi.

Season 2016–17
The team grew and because Futsal Malta Association regulations allowed teams to compete independently from any club within the Maltese football league system, Mdina Knights F.C. and the Student section ceased collaboration in 2016. The University of Malta Students' Futsal Team became an independent organisation and was recognised as an official student organisation by the senate of the University of Malta.

The team crowd funded its away kit, which would include the names of all those who contributed, in 2016.

In 2016–17, the team saw unprecedented successful performances (except for the match against Hamrun), and won important matches, for example, against Msida Futsal. The team entered the race for the Elite Group of the Gatorade Futsal League. With a draw against Sliema Futsal, the team achieved Elite status for the first time.

Season 2017–18
In the 2017–18 season, the team aimed to enter the Elite Round once again and was considered on par with the strongest clubs. However the club did not make it to the top round of Maltese futsal. The club also failed to win the Division One play-offs. Having finished first in the Division One pool, the team played a semi-final against Tarxien JMI and exited on penalties after a draw. In the Maltese Futsal Knockout Cup, the club managed to defeat Valletta FC Futsal Club in the quarter finals to arrive at the finals. The club defeated Luxol St Andrews Futsal Club with a five-to-two score and claimed its first trophy in Maltese domestic futsal. The team later presented the trophy to the rector of the University of Malta.

Season 2018–19
The team saw major changes in the squad—the departure of several key players, including Shawn Deguara to Valletta FC Futsal Club, and the departure of Kyle Sultana as coach. Former player Djordje Maksimović was appointed as the new coach.

The University Futsal Team confirmed its participation in the 2018–19 Maltese Futsal League.

Having won the Knockout Cup in the previous season, the club became eligible to contest the Maltese Futsal Super Cup. The University Team was defeated by Valletta FC Futsal by thirteen-to-one which made them the runners-up of the Super Cup.

The club appointed Clayton Felice as new coach. The team opened its league commitments on October 5 against UM Futsal Academy, its own academy team, and won nine-to-one. Three days later, on October 8, Luxol won against the senior University side eight-to-one. Birkirkara gained their first three points against University on October 17, winning seven-to-four.

New player Lee Grech proved a revelation and was called up to the Malta national futsal team. Grech scored the only goal for Malta on his debut on October 25, 2018, but the team lost two-to-one to the Northern Ireland national futsal team.

Kit evolution

Current squad 2019–20

Captaincy
Neil Cauchi
Melvin Borg

Technical staff
Head Coach:  Clayton Felice
Goalkeeping coach:  Alejandro García Melero
Physical coach:  David Spiteri
Team manager:  Jurgen D'Amato

Committee
Chief executive officer: Nicholas Martinelli
Chief in external and internal affairs: Jasmine Agius
Chief operations officer: Kurt Rizzo
Chief of administration: Nicole Agius
Chief financial officer: Ylenia Bugeja
Chief of events, planning and logistics: Calvin Scicluna
Chief of public relations and media: Kurt Aquilina
Chief of business development and marketing: Steph Dalli

Honorary titles
Honorary presidents:
 Gilli Amato Gauci
 Warren Sammut
 Stefan Cutajar

Club ambassador:
 Kyle Sultana

Former players
 Vazha Gvaramia
 Djordje Maksimović
  Alejandro Rubia
 Mamadou Diaby
 Nermin Hasanbegović
 José María Aguilera Castellano
 Dušan Rakić
 Daniele Degennaro
 Davide Iannacco
 Vanderlei Reis Augusto
 Ervin Rigo
 Ivan Jovanović
 Dalziel Bugeja
 Rodney Debono
 John Micallef
 Roberto Sarcia
 Jean Carl Cuschieri
 Shawn Deguara
 Andrew Camilleri
 Daniel Camilleri
 Matthew Gatt
 Kurt Drakard
 Ryan Micallef
 Nathanael Borg
 Ranald Portelli
 Jonathan Falzon
 Randall Vella
 Gaetano Gesualdi
 Paul Scerri
 Martin Attard

Academy
In the 2017–18 season, the club set up a second team called Junior College Futsal which referred to the sixth form operated by the University of Malta.

Junior College Futsal was renamed University of Malta Students' Futsal Academy in the 2018–19 season; their name was stylised as UM Futsal Academy. The team signed an agreement with the mother team that the academy will operate in line with the club's global vision.

Honours
Maltese Futsal Knockout Cup: Winners 2017–18
Maltese Futsal Super Cup: Runners-up 2018–19

References

Futsal clubs in Malta
University of Malta
Futsal clubs established in 2014
2014 establishments in Malta